Article One of the Georgia State Constitution describes the Georgia Bill of Rights, a set of forty paragraphs which enumerate the Rights of Persons, the Origin and Structure of Government and other General Provisions. The Georgia Bill of Rights was written by Thomas R.R. Cobb under the title Declaration of Fundamental Principals, as part of the Georgia Constitution of 1861 when the State of Georgia seceded from the United States of America and joined the Confederate States of America.

The first Section, the Rights of Persons, lists twenty-eight paragraphs of individual rights. Many of these rights are similar to the rights listed in the United States Bill of Rights. Yet, there are differences. For instance, the Georgia Bill of Rights lists among its freedoms the Freedom of Conscience, which is the "natural and inalienable right to worship God, each according to the dictates of that person's own conscience" without interference and adds the right to religious opinion along with freedom of religion.

Section II describes the "origin and foundation of government" as well as the "object of government". The second Section goes on to include paragraphs on the separation of powers and the superiority of civil authority over military authority. Also, this section explicitly describes the separation of church and state.

Finally, Section III, General Provisions, deals with Eminent Domain, private ways and Tidewater titles.

Section I: Rights of Persons
Paragraph I. Life, liberty, and property. No person shall be deprived of life, liberty, or property except by due process of law.

Paragraph II. Protection to person and property; equal protection. Protection to person and property is the paramount duty of government and shall be impartial and complete. No person shall be denied the equal protection of the laws.

Paragraph III. Freedom of conscience. Each person has the natural and inalienable right to worship God, each according to the dictates of that person's own conscience; and no human authority should, in any case, control or interfere with such right of conscience.

Paragraph IV. Religious opinions; freedom of religion. No inhabitant of this state shall be molested in person or property or be prohibited from holding any public office or trust on account of religious opinions; but the right of freedom of religion shall not be so construed as to excuse acts of licentiousness or justify practices inconsistent with the peace and safety of the state.

Paragraph V. Freedom of speech and of the press guaranteed. No law shall be passed to curtail or restrain the freedom of speech or of the press. Every person may speak, write, and publish sentiments on all subjects but shall be responsible for the abuse of that liberty.

Paragraph VI. Libel. In all civil or criminal actions for libel, the truth may be given in evidence; and, if it shall appear to the trier of fact that the matter charged as libelous is true, the party shall be discharged.

Paragraph VII. Citizens, protection of. All citizens of the United States, resident in this state, are hereby declared citizens of this state; and it shall be the duty of the General Assembly to enact such laws as will protect them in the full enjoyment of the rights, privileges, and immunities due to such citizenship.

Paragraph VIII. Arms, right to keep and bear. The right of the people to keep and bear arms shall not be infringed, but the General Assembly shall have power to prescribe the manner in which arms may be borne.

Paragraph IX. Right to assemble and petition. The people have the right to assemble peaceably for their common good and to apply by petition or remonstrance to those vested with the powers of government for redress of grievances.

Paragraph X. Bill of attainder; ex post facto laws; and retroactive laws. No bill of attainder, ex post facto law, retroactive law, or laws impairing the obligation of contract or making irrevocable grant of special privileges or immunities shall be passed.

Paragraph XI. Right to trial by jury; number of jurors; selection and compensation of jurors. (a) The right to trial by jury shall remain inviolate, except that the court shall render judgment without the verdict of a jury in all civil cases where no issuable defense is filed and where a jury is not demanded in writing by either party. In criminal cases, the defendant shall have a public and speedy trial by an impartial jury; and the jury shall be the judges of the law and the facts.

(b) A trial jury shall consist of 12 persons; but the General Assembly may prescribe any number, not less than six, to constitute a trial jury in courts of limited jurisdiction and in superior courts in misdemeanor cases.

(c) The General Assembly shall provide by law for the selection and compensation of persons to serve as grand jurors and trial jurors.

Paragraph XII. Right to the courts. No person shall be deprived of the right to prosecute or defend, either in person or by an attorney, that person's own cause in any of the courts of this state.

Paragraph XIII. Searches, seizures, and warrants. The right of the people to be secure in their persons, houses, papers, and effects against unreasonable searches and seizures shall not be violated; and no warrant shall issue except upon probable cause supported by oath or affirmation particularly describing the place or places to be searched and the persons or things to be seized.

Paragraph XIV. Benefit of counsel; accusation; list of witnesses; compulsory process. Every person charged with an offense against the laws of this state shall have the privilege and benefit of counsel; shall be furnished with a copy of the accusation or indictment and, on demand, with a list of the witnesses on whose testimony such charge is founded; shall have compulsory process to obtain the testimony of that person's own witnesses; and shall be confronted with the witnesses testifying against such person.

Paragraph XV. Habeas corpus. The writ of habeas corpus shall not be suspended unless, in case of rebellion or invasion, the public safety may require it.

Paragraph XVI. Self-incrimination. No person shall be compelled to give testimony tending in any manner to be self-incriminating.

Paragraph XVII. Bail; fines; punishment; arrest, abuse of prisoners. Excessive bail shall not be required, nor excessive fines imposed, nor cruel and unusual punishments inflicted; nor shall any person be abused in being arrested, while under arrest, or in prison.

Paragraph XVIII. Jeopardy of life or liberty more than once forbidden. No person shall be put in jeopardy of life or liberty more than once for the same offense except when a new trial has been granted after conviction or in case of mistrial.

Paragraph XIX. Treason. Treason against the State of Georgia shall consist of insurrection against the state, adhering to the state's enemies, or giving them aid and comfort. No person shall be convicted of treason except on the testimony of two witnesses to the same overt act or confession in open court.

Paragraph XX. Conviction, effect of. No conviction shall work corruption of blood or forfeiture of estate.

Paragraph XXI. Banishment and whipping as punishment for crime. Neither banishment beyond the limits of the state nor whipping shall be allowed as a punishment for crime.

Paragraph XXII. Involuntary servitude. There shall be no involuntary servitude within the State of Georgia except as a punishment for crime after legal conviction thereof or for contempt of court.

Paragraph XXIII. Imprisonment for debt. There shall be no imprisonment for debt.

Paragraph XXIV. Costs. No person shall be compelled to pay costs in any criminal case except after conviction on final trial.

Paragraph XXV. Status of the citizen. The social status of a citizen shall never be the subject of legislation.

Paragraph XXVI. Exemptions from levy and sale. The General Assembly shall protect by law from levy and sale by virtue of any process under the laws of this state a portion of the property of each person in an amount of not less than $1,600.00 and shall have authority to define to whom any such additional exemptions shall be allowed; to specify the amount of such exemptions; to provide for the manner of exempting such property and for the sale, alienation, and encumbrance thereof; and to provide for the waiver of said exemptions by the debtor.

Paragraph XXVII. Spouse's separate property. The separate property of each spouse shall remain the separate property of that spouse except as otherwise provided by law.

Paragraph XXVIII. Fishing and hunting. The tradition of fishing and hunting and the taking of fish and wildlife shall be preserved for the people and shall be managed by law and regulation for the public good.

Paragraph XXIX. Enumeration of rights not denial of others. The enumeration of rights herein contained as a part of this Constitution shall not be construed to deny to the people any inherent rights which they may have hitherto enjoyed.

Section II: Origin and Structure of Government
Paragraph I. Origin and foundation of government. All government, of right, originates with the people, is founded upon their will only, and is instituted solely for the good of the whole. Public officers are the trustees and servants of the people and are at all times amenable to them.

Paragraph II. Object of government. The people of this state have the inherent right of regulating their internal government. Government is instituted for the protection, security, and benefit of the people; and at all times they have the right to alter or reform the same whenever the public good may require it.

Paragraph III. Separation of legislative, judicial, and executive powers. The legislative, judicial, and executive powers shall forever remain separate and distinct; and no person discharging the duties of one shall at the same time exercise the functions of either of the others except as herein provided.

Paragraph IV. Contempts. The power of the courts to punish for contempt shall be limited by legislative acts.

Paragraph V. What acts void. Legislative acts in violation of this Constitution or the Constitution of the United States are void, and the judiciary shall so declare them.

Paragraph VI. Superiority of civil authority. The civil authority shall be superior to the military.

Paragraph VII. Separation of church and state. No money shall ever be taken from the public treasury, directly or indirectly, in aid of any church, sect, cult, or religious denomination or of any sectarian institution.

Paragraph VIII. Lotteries and nonprofit bingo games. (a) Except as herein specifically provided in this Paragraph VIII, all lotteries, and the sale of lottery tickets, and all forms of pari-mutuel betting and casino gambling are hereby prohibited; and this prohibition shall be enforced by penal laws.

(b) The General Assembly may by law provide that the operation of a nonprofit bingo game shall not be a lottery and shall be legal in this state. The General Assembly may by law define a nonprofit bingo game and provide for the regulation of nonprofit bingo games.

(c) The General Assembly may by law provide for the operation and regulation of a lottery or lotteries by or on behalf of the state and for any matters relating to the purposes or provisions of this subparagraph. Proceeds derived from the lottery or lotteries operated by or on behalf of the state shall be used to pay the operating expenses of the lottery or lotteries, including all prizes, without any appropriation required by law, and for educational programs and purposes as hereinafter provided. Lottery proceeds shall not be subject to Article VII, Section III, Paragraph II; Article III, Section IX, Paragraph VI(a); or Article III, Section IX, Paragraph IV(c), except that the net proceeds after payment of such operating expenses shall be subject to Article VII, Section III, Paragraph II. Net proceeds after payment of such operating expenses shall be separately accounted for and shall be specifically identified by the Governor in his annual budget presented to the General Assembly as a separate budget category entitled "Lottery Proceeds" and the Governor shall make specific recommendations as to educational programs and educational purposes to which said net proceeds shall be appropriated. In the General Appropriations Act adopted by the General Assembly, the General Assembly shall appropriate all net proceeds of the lottery or lotteries by such separate budget category to educational programs and educational purposes as specified by the General Assembly.

(c) The General Assembly may by law provide for the operation and regulation of a lottery or lotteries by or on behalf of the state and for any matters relating to the purposes or provisions of this subparagraph. Proceeds derived from the lottery or lotteries operated by or on behalf of the state shall be used to pay the operating expenses of the lottery or lotteries, including all prizes, without any appropriation required by law, and for educational programs and purposes as hereinafter provided. Lottery proceeds shall not be subject to Article VII, Section III, Paragraph II; Article III, Section IX, Paragraph VI(a); or Article III, Section IX, Paragraph IV(c), except that the net proceeds after payment of such operating expenses shall be subject to Article VII, Section III, Paragraph II. Net proceeds after payment of such operating expenses shall be separately accounted for and shall be specifically identified by the Governor in his annual budget presented to the General Assembly as a separate budget category entitled 'Lottery Proceeds' and the Governor shall make specific recommendations as to educational programs and educational purposes to which said net proceeds shall be appropriated. In the General Appropriations Act adopted by the General Assembly, the General Assembly shall appropriate all net proceeds of the lottery or lotteries by such separate budget category to educational programs and educational purposes. Such net proceeds shall be used to support improvements and enhancements for educational programs and purposes and such net proceeds shall be used to supplement, not supplant, non-lottery educational resources for educational programs and purposes. The educational programs and educational purposes for which proceeds may be so appropriated shall include only the following:

      
(1) Tuition grants, scholarships, or loans to citizens of this state to enable such citizens to attend colleges and universities located within this state, regardless of whether such colleges or universities are operated by the board of regents, or to attend institutions operated under the authority of the Department of Technical and Adult Education; 
      
(2) Voluntary pre-kindergarten; 
      
(3) One or more educational shortfall reserves in a total amount of not less than 10 percent of the net proceeds of the lottery for the preceding fiscal year;
      
(4) Costs of providing to teachers at accredited public institutions who teach levels K-12, personnel at public postsecondary technical institutes under the authority of the Department of Technical and Adult Education, and professors and instructors within the University System of Georgia the necessary training in the use and application of computers and advanced electronic instructional technology to implement interactive learning environments in the classroom and to access the state-wide distance learning network; and
      
(5) Capital outlay projects for educational facilities; provided, however, that no funds shall be appropriated for the items listed in paragraphs (4) and (5) of this subsection until all persons eligible for and applying for assistance as provided in paragraph (1) of this subsection have received such assistance, all approved pre-kindergarten programs provided for in paragraph (2) of this subsection have been fully funded, and the education shortfall reserve or reserves provided for in paragraph (3) of this subsection have been fully funded.

(d) On and after January 1, 1995, the holding of raffles by nonprofit organizations shall be lawful and shall not be prohibited by any law enacted prior to January 1, 1994. Laws enacted on or after January 1, 1994, however, may restrict, regulate, or prohibit the operation of such raffles.

Paragraph IX. Sovereign immunity and waiver thereof; claims against the state and its departments, agencies, officers, and employees. (a) The General Assembly may waive the state's sovereign immunity from suit by enacting a State Tort Claims Act, in which the General Assembly may provide by law for procedures for the making, handling, and disposition of actions or claims against the state and its departments, agencies, officers, and employees, upon such terms and subject to such conditions and limitations as the General Assembly may provide.

(b) The General Assembly may also provide by law for the processing and disposition of claims against the state which do not exceed such maximum amount as provided therein.

(c) The state's defense of sovereign immunity is hereby waived as to any action ex contractu for the breach of any written contract now existing or hereafter entered into by the state or its departments and agencies.

(d) Except as specifically provided by the General Assembly in a State Tort Claims Act, all officers and employees of the state or its departments and agencies may be subject to suit and may be liable for injuries and damages caused by the negligent performance of, or negligent failure to perform, their ministerial functions and may be liable for injuries and damages if they act with actual malice or with actual intent to cause injury in the performance of their official functions. Except as provided in this subparagraph, officers and employees of the state or its departments and agencies shall not be subject to suit or liability, and no judgment shall be entered against them, for the performance or nonperformance of their official functions. The provisions of this subparagraph shall not be waived.

(e) Except as specifically provided in this Paragraph, sovereign immunity extends to the state and all of its departments and agencies. The sovereign immunity of the state and its departments and agencies can only be waived by an Act of the General Assembly which specifically provides that sovereign immunity is thereby waived and the extent of such waiver.

(f) No waiver of sovereign immunity under this Paragraph shall be construed as a waiver of any immunity provided to the state or its departments, agencies, officers, or employees by the United States Constitution.

Section III: General Provisions
Paragraph I. Eminent domain. (a) Except as otherwise provided in this Paragraph, private property shall not be taken or damaged for public purposes without just and adequate compensation being first paid.

(b) When private property is taken or damaged by the state or the counties or municipalities of the state for public road or street purposes, or for public transportation purposes, or for any other public purposes as determined by the General Assembly, just and adequate compensation therefor need not be paid until the same has been finally fixed and determined as provided by law; but such just and adequate compensation shall then be paid in preference to all other obligations except bonded indebtedness.

(c) The General Assembly may by law require the condemnor to make prepayment against adequate compensation as a condition precedent to the exercise of the right of eminent domain and provide for the disbursement of the same to the end that the rights and equities of the property owner, lien holders, and the state and its subdivisions may be protected.

(d) The General Assembly may provide by law for the payment by the condemnor of reasonable expenses, including attorney's fees, incurred by the condemnee in determining just and adequate compensation.

(e) Notwithstanding any other provision of the Constitution, the General Assembly may provide by law for relocation assistance and payments to persons displaced through the exercise of the power of eminent domain or because of public projects or programs; and the powers of taxation may be exercised and public funds expended in furtherance thereof.

Paragraph II. Private ways. In case of necessity, private ways may be granted upon just and adequate compensation being first paid by the applicant.

Paragraph III. Tidewater titles confirmed. The Act of the General Assembly approved December 16, 1902, which extends the title of ownership of lands abutting on tidal water to low water mark, is hereby ratified and confirmed.

Section IV: Marriage
Paragraph I. Recognition of marriage. (a) This state shall recognize as marriage only
the union of man and woman. Marriages between persons of the same sex are prohibited in
this state.

(b) No union between persons of the same sex shall be recognized by this state as entitled
to the benefits of marriage. This state shall not give effect to any public act, record, or
judicial proceeding of any other state or jurisdiction respecting a relationship between persons
of the same sex that is treated as a marriage under the laws of such other state or jurisdiction.
The courts of this state shall have no jurisdiction to grant a divorce or separate
maintenance with respect to any such relationship or otherwise to consider or rule on any
of the parties´ respective rights arising as a result of or in connection with such relationship.

 Section IV has since been overturned by the Federal Court Ruling, Obergefell v. Hodges.

Background

The Georgia Bill of Rights was ratified, along with the Georgia Constitution of 1861, soon after the State of Georgia seceded from the Union on 18 January 1861. Prior to the creation of the Bill of Rights, Georgia's previous four Constitutions protected only a relative few civil liberties. With the end of the American Civil War in 1865 the abolition of slavery was added to the Bill of Rights in Section I, the Rights of Persons. Also added to that Section, in 1877, was a prohibition against whipping of criminals and banishment of criminals.

References

See also
Bill of rights
United States Bill of Rights

Georgia (U.S. state) law
Constitution of Georgia (U.S. state)